The 2022–23 P. League+ season is the 3rd season of the P. League+ (PLG).

Transactions

Retirement
 On April 25, 2022, Elliot Tan announced his retirement from professional basketball.
 On December 25, 2022, Anthony Tucker announced his retirement from professional basketball.
 On January 5, 2023, Oscar Lin joined Kaohsiung 17LIVE Steelers as individual skills coach and intepreter, ending his playing career.

Coaching changes

Off-season
 On July 1, 2022, the Taoyuan Pilots hired Iurgi Caminos as their new head coach.
 On July 19, 2022, the Kaohsiung Steelers head assistant coach, Slavoljub Gorunovic was promoted to the head coach.
 On October 28, 2022, the Kaohsiung 17LIVE Steelers fired head coach Slavoljub Gorunovic and named Hung Chi-Chao as their interim head coach.

In-season
 On November 10, 2022, the Kaohsiung 17LIVE Steelers hired Dean Murray as their new head coach.
 On December 29, 2022, the Kaohsiung 17LIVE Steelers fired head coach Dean Murray and named Hung Chi-Chao as their interim head coach.
 On January 7, 2023, the Kaohsiung 17LIVE Steelers named Cheng Chih-Lung as their new head coach.
 On January 10, 2023, the Formosa Taishin Dreamers head coach Kyle Julius resigned, named assistant coach Lai Po-Lin as their new head coach.

Imports / Foreign Student / Heritage Player

Note 1: Heritage player refers to player of Taiwanese descent but does not met the FIBA eligibility rules to be local.

Note 2: Team can either register 2 heritage players or 1 foreign student and 1 heritage player.

Interleague Play
The Interleague Play, an interleague tournament which was played by teams from P. League+, T1 League, and Super Basketball League, began on September 17, 2022 and ended on September 27. The Lioneers competed individually, while the other five teams participated as a united team named "PLG Rising Stars".

Preseason
The Preseason will begin on October 8, 2022, and end on October 10.

Regular season
The regular season will begin on November 5, 2022, and will end on May 14, 2023.

Notes
 z – Clinched home court advantage for the entire playoffs
 x – Clinched playoff spot

Results

Postponed games due to COVID-19
 The January 14 game between the Taipei Fubon Braves and the Kaohsiung 17LIVE Steelers was postponed due to the Steelers not having the required minimum players available.
 The January 17 game between the Kaohsiung 17LIVE Steelers and the New Taipei Kings was postponed due to the Steelers not having the required minimum players available.

Statistics

Individual statistic leaders

Individual game highs

Team statistic leaders

Awards

Players of the Week

Regular season

Players of the Month

Media
The games will be aired on television via FTV One and MOMOTV, and will be broadcast online on YouTube Official Channel, 4GTV and Line TV.

Notable occurrences 
 The PLG schedule expanded from 30 games per team to 40.
 The Taoyuan Pilots was renamed to Taoyuan Pauian Pilots.
 The Kaohsiung Steelers was renamed to Kaohsiung 17LIVE Steelers.

References

External links
 

 
P.
2022–23 in Asian basketball leagues